Unique Whips is an American reality television show that aired on the now-defunct Speed network from 2005 to 2008. It premiered on February 8, 2005, The show follows the work of Unique Autosports, based in Long Island, New York, as they customize celebrity automobiles. It was created and Produced by Steve Hillebrand and Corey Damsker of Hollywood East. The customization generally consists of car stereo, wheels, custom paint and interior work. Celebrities whose cars were featured on the show include P. Diddy, DJ Pauly D, Jeff Gordon, Tony Stewart, Pam Anderson, Patti LaBelle, 50 Cent, LeBron James, Carmelo Anthony, Marcus Camby, Fat Joe, and Tom Wolfe.

Spinoffs and related works
Unique Autosports: Miami ran on the Spike network for one season.

On 2 February 2016, a sequel television series featuring Unique Autosports, Unique Rides, premiered on Discovery's Velocity (now Motor Trend) channel. The first episode featured Castro modifying a Cadillac Escalade for Jason Derulo. The series ran for 3 seasons.

Celebrity rides
P. Diddy - 2 Jeep Wrangler Unlimited
B-Real – 2007 Nissan Pathfinder, 2007 Nissan Armada
Pharrell Williams - 1998 Nissan Maxima, 1993 Toyota Supra, 1994 BMW 3 Series 1988 Hyundai Excel Sedan
LeBron James - 2003 Hummer H2, Ferrari F430
Orlando Brown - 1996 Chevrolet Impala SS, 2007 Ford F-650
50 Cent - 2007 Lamborghini Murcielago Roadster, 2006 Rolls-Royce Phantom, 2005 Chrysler 300C, 2008 Pontiac G8
Chi-Ali - 2004 Nissan Altima, 2009 Chevrolet Impala, 1995 Ford Mustang Coupe, 2003 Hummer H2, 2000 Toyota Camry, 1997 Ford F-150 Harley Davidson Edition
Lloyd Banks - 1972 Chevrolet Impala, 2006 Bentley Continental, Bulletproof SUV, 2003 Hummer H2
KRS-One - Chevrolet Monte Carlo Stock Car
Jadakiss - 2004 Range Rover, 2005 Chevrolet Corvette, 2004 Mercedes-Benz S-Class, 2005 Cadillac XLR, GMC Yukon Denali, 2003 Cadillac Escalade, 1997 Chevrolet Tahoe
Fat Joe - 2005 Bentley Continental
Dewayne Robertson - Dodge Charger SRT8, Land Rover Range Rover, Cadillac Escalade, Hummer H2
Al Harrington - 2007 Cadillac Escalade, Bentley Continental GT
Busta Rhymes - Rolls-Royce Phantom, 1997 Ford F-150 Harley Davidson Edition, Lamborghini Diablo, 1988 Chevrolet Caprice
Queen Latifah - Lamborghini Murcielago, 1984 Cadillac Hearse, 1973 Chevrolet Impala Convertible
Mike McGlone - 2006 Chevrolet Impala, 1995 Cadillac Fleetwood
Carmelo Anthony - Lincoln Continental
Timbaland - 2002 Porsche Cayenne
Charles Barkley - Ferrari 458 Spider, Jaguar XJ220, Hummer H1, Aston Martin Vanquish, Lamborghini Gallardo
Tony Yayo - 2003 Hummer H2, Mercedes-Benz CLS-Class
Young Buck - 2003 BMW 760li
The Game - 2003 Cadillac Escalade
Jerricho Cotchery - Bentley Continental Flying Spur
Gary Sheffield - Cadillac Escalade
Marcus Camby - Hummer H2, Corvette
Marcus Banks - Land Rover Range Rover, BMW 745i
Byron Leftwich - 1967 Lincoln Continental Convertible
Jason Giambi - Cadillac Escalade
Nelly - Bentley Continental GT
Ruben Sierra - Ford F-150 Harley Davidson Edition truck
GZA - Dodge Magnum
Patti LaBelle - Mercedes Benz CLS 55
Barry Gardner - Mercedes Benz CLS 55
Wyclef Jean - 1994 BMW 5-Series, 1988 Chevrolet Caprice Sedan, 1992 Honda Civic Sedan 
Jennifer Capriati - 2005 Range Rover
Robinson Cano - Cadillac Escalade
Andruw Jones - Aston-Martin, Buick Electra 225
Livan Hernandez - Ferrari F430
Bernard Hopkins - Bentley Continental GT Convertible
Brad Miller - 2005 Ford Excursion
RZA - 2005 Chevy Trailblazer
Jazze Pha - 1998 Land Rover Range Rover, 2014 Chevrolet Tahoe, 2003 Dodge Durango, 2016 Dodge Charger
Jason Derulo - 2016 Cadillac Escalade

References

External links
 Unique Whips, Speed page 
 Unique Autosports Miami, Spike TV page 
 Willcastro.com 
 Will Castro Foundation 

Automotive television series
Speed (TV network) original programming
American sports television series
2005 American television series debuts
2008 American television series endings